Veli Sahiti is Albanian singer and composer from Kosovo. In 1973, he formed his group called Trix with Albanian rock and pop elements.

Discography
 Krushqit e pajtimit, 1990
 Bukë, kripë e zemër, 1991
 Vala e re, 1992
 Toka ime, 1993
 Vallja e rinisë, 1994
 Si të them, 1995
 Çohu, more Rexho, 1996
 Fati nuk është iluzion, 1997
 Balada X, 1998
 Kurora digjet në zjarr, 1998
 Lamtumirë, gjeneratë, 2000
 Vallëzimi i yjeve, 2001
 Moj e mira te pojata, 2002
 Iluzion, 2003
 Engjulli im, 2005
 Imazhi yt, 2006
 Shëtitjet në Ulpianë, 2008.

References

External links
 Passagen: Trix
 Albasoul (Downloads)
 YouTube: Trix with Veli Sahiti

Living people
Kosovan singers
Kosovan composers
Male composers
Kosovo Albanians
Year of birth missing (living people)